Theodore Manakas (born February 22, 1951), is an American former professional basketball player for the Kansas City-Omaha Kings. He played in five National Basketball Association (NBA) games.

Raised in Fort Lee, New Jersey, Manakas played prep basketball at Fort Lee High School.

References 

1951 births
Living people
American men's basketball players
Atlanta Hawks draft picks
Basketball players from New Jersey
Kansas City Kings players
People from Fort Lee, New Jersey
Princeton Tigers men's basketball players
Shooting guards
Sportspeople from Bergen County, New Jersey
Fort Lee High School alumni